Heteracris littoralis is a species of short-horned grasshopper in the family Acrididae. It is found in Africa, southern Europe, and Asia.

References

External links

 

Acrididae